An alphabetical list of towns in German state of Thuringia.

In alphabetical order

By year of becoming town
This list contains all towns in the German state Thuringia sorted by the year they became town. Towns with a population of more than 10,000 are bold and towns belonging to another town today are in italics.

!